Chiangism, also known as the Political Philosophy of Chiang Kai-shek, or Chiang Kai-shek Thought, is the political philosophy of President Generalissimo Chiang Kai-shek, who used it during his rule in China under the Kuomintang on both the mainland and Taiwan. It is a right-wing authoritarian nationalist political ideology which is based on mostly Confucian and Tridemist ideologies, and was used in the New Life Movement in China and the Chinese Cultural Renaissance movement in Taiwan. It is a syncretic mix of many political ideologies, including revolutionary nationalism, Tridemism, socialism (until 1955), militarism, Confucianism, state capitalism, constitutionalism, fascism, authoritarian capitalism (from 1955), and paternalistic conservatism, as well as Chiang's Methodist Christianity.

The extent of the influence of fascism on Chiang’s ideology is perceived differently among scholars. Dictatorial power is used in a Chiangist government in times of war, civil unrest, and rebellion. Throughout its existence, Chiangism has promoted strong Chinese nationalism throughout the territories controlled by the ROC, as well as promoting Tridemist ideals of a unified Chinese national identity. The Chiangist government mandated Mandarin and heavily empathizes Chinese history and culture in national education curriculums. Mao Zedong and the Chinese Communist Party (CCP) heavily criticized the nationalist practice of the Chiangist KMT government, and denounced it as "Han-Centric Chauvinism". The influence of Chiangism was largely diminished in Mainland China by the Campaign to Suppress Counterrevolutionaries of the communists and most of the influence of Chiangism began to wane at the start of democratization on Taiwan.

History
The socialist ideology of the Kuomintang was one of the ideologies which greatly influenced this philosophy. In the West, Chiang Kai-shek was hailed as one of the world's greatest socialist leaders. His portraits were carried along with portraits of  Karl Marx, Vladimir Lenin, Joseph Stalin, and other socialist and communist leaders. Chiang Kai-shek would soon be an enemy of the CCP in the Chinese Civil War, in trying to counter the rebellion started by his rival, Mao Zedong and his more successful ideology: Maoism.

Unlike Sun's original Three Principles of the People ideology that was heavily influenced by Western enlightenment theorists such as Henry George, Abraham Lincoln, Russell, and Mill, the traditional Chinese Confucian influence on Chiang’s ideology is much stronger. Chiang rejected the Western progressive ideologies of individualism, liberalism, and the cultural aspects of Marxism. Therefore, Chiangism is generally more culturally and socially conservative than Sun Yat-sen ideologically.

The Kuomintang government under Chiang Kai-shek denounced feudalism as counterrevolutionary and proclaimed itself to be revolutionary. He accused other Chinese warlords of being feudalists. Despite being a conservative ideology, Chiangism was supportive of modernisation policies such as women’s rights, scientific advancement, and universal education.

The Kuomintang and the Nationalist Government supported women's suffrage and education, and the abolition of polygamy and foot binding. The government of the Republic of China under Chiang’s leadership also enacted a women’s quota in the parliament with reserved seats for women. During the Nanjing Decade, average Chinese citizens received the education they’d never had the chance to get in the dynasties that increased the literacy rate across China. The education also promotes the ideals of Tridemism of democracy, republicanism, science, constitutionalism, and Chinese Nationalism based on the Political Tutelage of the Kuomintang.

Doctrine

Chinese nationalism and anti-imperialism
The Kuomintang was a Chinese nationalist revolutionary party, which had been supported by the Soviet Union. It was organized on Leninism.

Chiang Kai-shek, the head of the Kuomintang, warned the Soviet Union and other foreign countries about interfering in Chinese affairs. He was personally angry at the way China was treated by foreigners, mainly by the Soviet Union, Britain, and the United States. Chiang's New Life Movement campaigned for the end of Soviet, Western, American, and other foreign influences in China. Chen Lifu, a CC Clique member in the KMT, said, "Communism originated from Soviet imperialism, which has encroached on our country."  It was also noted that "the white bear of the North Pole is known for its viciousness and cruelty."

Chiang was also staunchly against imperialism and colonialism, as he opposed FDR's offer of China’s seizure of Indochina and argued that China had no intent to replace western imperialism with its own. He also viewed foreign powers, including the USA, the USSR, and the Empire of Japan as imperialist powers that wanted to exploit China.

Authoritarian capitalism and dirigisme
After the government of the Republic of China moved to Taiwan, Chiang Kai-shek's economic policy turned towards to economic liberalism. He used Sho-Chieh Tsiang and other liberal economists to promote economic liberalization reforms in Taiwan.

However, Taylor has noted that the developmental model of Chiangism in Taiwan still had elements of socialism, and the Gini index of Taiwan was around 0.28 by the 1970s, lower than the relatively equal West Germany. Taiwan was one of the most equal countries in the pro-western bloc. The lower 40% income group doubled their income share to 22% of total income, with the upper 20% shrinking from 61% to 39%, compared to Japanese rule. The Chiangist economic model can be seen as a form of dirigisme or bureaucratic capitalism, with the state playing a crucial role in directing the market economy. Small businesses flourished under this economic model in Taiwan, but it didn’t see the emergence of corporate monopolies, unlike most other major capitalist countries.

After the democratization of Taiwan, it began to slowly drift away from the Chiangist economic policy to embrace a more free market system, as part of the economic globalization process under the context of neoliberalism.

Anti-communism and fascism
The Blue Shirts Society were a fascist ultranationalist paramilitary organization within the Kuomintang. They were modeled after Benito Mussolini's Blackshirts of the National Fascist Party and the Sturmabteilung of the NSDAP and were anti-communist and rigorously nationalist. The intended goal of the Blue Shirts was to destroy the communists, "suppress feudal influences", and "deal with foreign insults", in particular, Japanese and Western. In addition to being anti-communist, some Kuomintang members, like Chiang Kai-shek's right-hand man, Dai Li, were anti-American, and wanted to expel American influence from China. Close Sino-German ties also promoted cooperation between the Nationalist Government and Nazi Germany.

The New Life Movement was started by Chiang Kai-shek under Confucian ideals. It was a government-led civic campaign in the 1930s Republic of China to promote cultural reform and Neo-Confucian social morality and to ultimately unite China under a centralised ideology following the emergence of ideological challenges to the status quo. The movement itself was modelled on Confucianism, mixed with Christianity, nationalism, and authoritarianism that have some similarities to fascism, and thus, it rejected individualism and liberalism. The Kuomintang launched the initiative on 19 February 1934, as part of an anti-communist campaign, and soon enlarged the campaign to target all of China.

Some historians regard this movement as imitating Nazism and regarded this movement as being a neo-nationalistic movement used to elevate Chiang's control of everyday lives. Frederic Wakeman suggested that the New Life Movement was "Confucian fascism", However, Chiang repeatedly attacked his enemies such as the Empire of Japan as fascistic and ultra-militaristic. The Sino-German relationship also rapidly deteriorated as Germany failed to pursue a detente between China and Japan, which led to the outbreak of the Second Sino-Japanese War. China later declared war on fascist countries, including Germany, Italy, and Japan, as part of the Declarations of war during World War II.

Other historians, such as Jay Taylor, argue that Chiang’s ideology does not espouse the general ideology of fascism despite his growing sympathies with fascist ideas in the 1930s.

The military played a large role in China's government during Chiang's rule, with the National Revolutionary Army under direct control of the Kuomintang until 1946.

Anti-capitalism and revolutionary nationalism
Contrary to the view that he was pro-capitalist, Chiang Kai-shek behaved in an antagonistic manner to the capitalists in China, often attacking them and confiscating their capital and assets for the use of the government.

Chiang cracked down on pro-communist worker and peasant organisations and the rich Shanghai capitalists at the same time. Chiang Kai-shek continued Sun's anti-capitalist ideology. The Republic of China's media openly attacked the capitalists and capitalism, supporting a government-controlled economy instead of privately owned ones.

Jay Taylor has noted that Chiang’s hybrid revolutionary nationalism ideology is inspired by both the French republican movement and Confucianism. He described Chiang as a "left-leaning Confucian-Jacobinist".

See also

References

Chiang Kai-shek
Ideology of the Kuomintang
Socialism in China
Chinese nationalism
Conservatism in China
Conservatism in Taiwan
Paternalistic conservatism
Three Principles of the People
Fascism in Taiwan
Fascism in Asia
Right-wing politics in China
Eponymous political ideologies